Hipnosis is the second studio album by American rap rock/funk metal band Shootyz Groove. It was released on June 24, 1997 by Roadrunner Records.

Background
After their 1994 album Jammin' In Vicious Environments failed to attract mainstream attention, Shootyz Groove departed the major label Mercury Records for the-then independently run metal label Roadrunner Records. Following the release of Hipnosis in mid-1997, Shootyz Groove again switched labels, moving to the major label Reprise Records, who would release their third studio album in 1999.

Reception

Stephen Thomas Erlewine of AllMusic gave Hipnosis a positive four-star review. He states that "After releasing two albums to no success on Mercury, Shootyz Groove moved to Roadrunner for Hipnosis. Ironically, the group turned in their best, most focused effort to date on the indie label. " Erlewine characterized the album as "Tempering the heavy metal influences that underpinned their previous two albums with punk, ska, rap and funk."

Track listing

References

1997 albums
Roadrunner Records albums